= Legislature of Georgia =

Legislature of Georgia may refer to

- the Parliament of Georgia, the unicameral legislature of the independent country of Georgia
  - the Senate (Georgia), the prospective upper house of the GGA
  - the Council of the Republic (Georgia), the prospective lower house of the GGA
- the Georgia General Assembly, the bicameral legislature of the U.S. State of Georgia
  - the Georgia State Senate, the upper house of the GGA
  - the Georgia House of Representatives, the lower house of the GGA
